United Nations Security Council Resolution 152, adopted on August 23, 1960, after examining the application of the Republic of the Congo for membership in the United Nations the Council recommended to the General Assembly that the Republic of the Congo be admitted.

The resolution was approved by all 11 members of the Council.

See also
List of United Nations Security Council Resolutions 101 to 200 (1953–1965)

References
Text of the Resolution at undocs.org

External links
 

 0152
Foreign relations of the Republic of the Congo
History of the Republic of the Congo
 0152
1960 in the Republic of the Congo
 0152
August 1960 events